Mark Wang is a Chinese disabled rights advocate, known through television series in Norway and China and through the biographical musical Some Sunny Night written by Norwegian composer Thomas Stanghelle.

Biography
Mark Wang was a passenger aboard China Northwest Airlines Flight 2119 from Yinchuan to Beijing on July 23, 1993. His spinal column was severely injured when the aircraft failed to get airborne and crashed into a lake. As a result, he was paralyzed from the waist down. Because of his injuries he was moved to Beijing Rehabilitation and Research Center (BRRC) in September 1993. At the time, BRRC and Sunnaas Hospital in Oslo, Norway had established a cooperation program, and a tour of BRRC's facilities in Beijing was included in Queen Sonja of Norway's royal visit to China. As a patron of Red Cross Nordic United World College (RCNUWC), Queen Sonja donated a scholarship to BRRC which was subsequently awarded to Mark Wang.

While a student at Red Cross Nordic United World College, Mark Wang befriended the Norwegian marathon runner and disabled rights activist Ketil Moe. Through collaborative efforts, they were able to establish the Beijing Marathon for the Disabled in 1998.

While at the United World College, Mark Wang also wrote an autobiography given the English title Hold Up The Blue Sky of Life. This autobiography became a best-seller in China, and became the basis of an 18-installment CCTV produced TV-series about his life. In the 2008 Beijing Olympics, Mark Wang was selected as a carrier in the Olympic torch relay.

In 2008, he became a member of the UWC International Council, two years later founding the UWC National Committee of China, later becoming its Chair. In 2015, he founded UWC Changshu China.

References

1981 births
Living people
People from Yinchuan
Survivors of aviation accidents or incidents
People educated at a United World College